Ananthu was an Indian screenwriter working on Tamil language films, often collaborating with K. Balachander. He was the mentor of actor Kamal Haasan.

Career 
Ananthu was a screenwriter and close associate of director K. Balachander. He also worked with director C. Rudraiah on his two films. In the title card, Rudhraiya had dedicated the film Aval Appadithan to Ananthu. Ananthu was sub-dialogue writer with Chitralaya Gopu for the films Anubhavam Pudhumai and Galatta Kalyanam directed by C. V. Rajendran. Ananthu acted in the film Galatta Kalyanam with Sivaji Ganesan and Jayalalitha after intermission.

In 1991, Ananthu directed Sigaram starring S. P. Balasubrahmanyam, Anand Babu, Radha and Ramya Krishnan. A critic noted "with an eye for realism and a talent for profound dialogue, Ananthu makes this a memorable entry into the annals of parallel cinema."

Work experience with Kamal Haasan 
Ananthu was considered by Kamal Haasan as a close associate and mentor. Through Ananthu, Haasan was able to maintain close ties with K. Balachander.

In the early 1970s, Kamal Haasan had become jaded and suicidal with the monotonous, low-key roles that he was receiving from Tamil cinema. He later credited Ananthu for reinvigorating his interest in films, after taking up his suggestion of moving to work on Malayalam films. During the period, Ananthu continued to nurture Kamal Haasan's talent by evaluating his on-screen performances and by introducing him to world cinema. Haasan has also credited Ananthu for teaching him screenwriting.

Ananthu continued to work closely with Haasan for a number of his films in the 1990s through various capacities. He was behind the title of Nammavar, a term also later adapted by Kamal Haasan in his political activities.

Following Ananthu's death in 1998, Kamal Haasan's first Tamil directorial venture Hey Ram (2000) was dedicated to Ananthu. After winning the Henri Langlois award in 2016, Kamal Haasan dedicated the award to Ananthu. An official portrait of Ananthu was inaugurated in 2019 at Kamal Haasan's offices as a part of celebrations marking the actor's 60th year in the film industry.

Partial filmography

References

External links 
 

Indian film directors
Indian screenwriters
Tamil film directors
Tamil-language film directors
Tamil screenwriters
20th-century Indian film directors
Film directors from Tamil Nadu
Screenwriters from Tamil Nadu
Year of birth missing
1998 deaths
20th-century Indian screenwriters